Morris Sharaud Curry (born May 16, 1987) is an American professional basketball point guard who last played for MZT Skopje of the Macedonian League. Curry graduated from Joseph Wheeler High School in Georgia, where his team won basketball state championships in 2003 and 2005. He attended Providence College from 2005 to 2010. As a freshman at Providence, Curry was named to the Big East all-rookie team.

Curry joined MZT Skopje on January 27, 2022.

Honours
Joseph Wheeler High School –  2003–2005
Georgia High School Association – State Championship (5A) – 2003
Georgia High School Association – State Championship (5A) – 2005
Joseph Wheeler High School – 3rd All-Time Points Scored

Providence College –  2005–2010
Big East Conference – All-Rookie Team
Bob Cousy Award – Finalist
Providence Friars men's basketball – Male Athlete of the Year
Providence Friars men's basketball – All-Time Best FT %
Providence Friars men's basketball – 10th All-Time Points Scored

Allianz Swans Gmunden –  2011–2012
ÖBL Most Valuable Player
Austrian Cup
Austrian Supercup
EuroCup Basketball Awards – Guard of the year
EuroCup Basketball Awards – 1st Team All-League
EuroCup Basketball Awards – 1st Team All-Imports
EuroCup Basketball Awards – Import of the Year

KTP-Basket –  2013–2014
EuroCup Basketball MVP
EuroCup Basketball Awards – Guard of the year
EuroCup Basketball Awards – 1st Team All-League
EuroCup Basketball Awards – 1st Team All-Imports

References

External links
Providence Friars bio
Sharaud Curry at Eurobasket.com

1987 births
Living people
AEK B.C. players
Swans Gmunden players
American expatriate basketball people in Austria
American expatriate basketball people in Estonia
American expatriate basketball people in Finland
American expatriate basketball people in France
American expatriate basketball people in Germany
American expatriate basketball people in Greece
American expatriate basketball people in Poland
American expatriate basketball people in Turkey
American men's basketball players
Basketball players from Georgia (U.S. state)
BC Kalev/Cramo players
Giessen 46ers players
People from Gainesville, Georgia
Point guards
Providence Friars men's basketball players
Reims Champagne Basket players
Sportspeople from the Atlanta metropolitan area
Kaposvári KK players